Sagwa may refer to:
Kim Sagwa (born 1984), South Korean writer
Sagwa, neighbourhood of Grand Bay–Westfield, New Brunswick, Canada
Sa-kwa, 2005 South Korean film
Sagwa, the Chinese Siamese Cat (book), a 1994 children's book by Amy Tan
Sagwa,  main character of the 2000s television series Sagwa, the Chinese Siamese Cat
A character in the film Solo: A Star Wars Story